Vanessa Redgrave is an English actress whose career has spanned over six decades. She began her career in theater before making her feature film debut in Behind the Mask (1958), before starring in the Italian thriller Blowup (1966), and the comedy Morgan – A Suitable Case for Treatment (also 1966), the latter of which earned her her first Academy Award nomination (in the category of Best Actress), as well as a BAFTA nomination. Redgrave subsequently starred in the musical Camelot (1967), before portraying American dancer Isadora Duncan in the biopic Isadora (1968), which earned her a second Academy Award nomination. Her portrayal of the title character in 1971's Mary, Queen of Scots earned Redgrave a third Academy Award nomination. The same year, she appeared in Ken Russell's controversial historical drama-horror film The Devils.

Redgrave garnered widespread praise for her leading role in the drama Julia (1977), opposite Jane Fonda, for which she won her first Academy Award, in the category of Best Supporting Actress, as well as a Golden Globe award. She followed this with the title character of Agatha (1979), a biopic of writer Agatha Christie, before starring in The Bostonians (1984), a James Ivory-directed adaptation of the 1886 novel of the same name by American writer Henry James; this role earned Redgrave her fifth Academy Award nomination. She subsequently starred as the transgender tennis player Renée Richards in the television film Second Serve (1986), which earned her her seventh Golden Globe nomination.

In 1990, Redgrave starred in a film version of Tennessee Williams's Orpheus Descending, reprising the role she had played on Broadway, both under the direction of Peter Hall. She followed this with a lead role opposite her sister, Lynn, in a television film version of What Ever Happened to Baby Jane...?, and also appeared in a leading role in the independent drama The Ballad of the Sad Café (both 1991). She received a sixth Academy Award nomination for her role in Howards End (1992), an adaptation of the 1910 E. M. Forster novel of the same name. Through the 1990s, Redgrave appeared in a number of mainstream American films, including the thriller Mother's Boys (1993), Brian De Palma's action spy film Mission: Impossible (1996), Deep Impact (1998), and the period drama Girl, Interrupted (1999). She subsequently earned further acclaim for her role in the lesbian-themed anthology film If These Walls Could Talk 2 (2000), for which she won a Golden Globe for Best Supporting Actress in a Television Film.

Redgrave continued to appear in supporting parts, including the Sean Penn-directed thriller The Pledge (2001), the television Lord Byron biopic Byron (2003), and the dramas Evening (2007) and Atonement (2007). From 2004 to 2009, Redgrave had a recurring guest role on the television series Nip/Tuck, portraying Dr. Erica Noughton. In the 2010s, she appeared in supporting roles in several critically acclaimed studio films, such as Lee Daniels's The Butler (2013), Foxcatcher (2014), and Film Stars Don't Die in Liverpool (2017).

Film

Television

Stage

See also
List of awards and nominations received by Vanessa Redgrave

References

Sources

External links

Actress filmographies
British filmographies